Pseudohermonassa ononensis is a moth of the family Noctuidae. It is found in the Southern Siberian Mountains, Kyrghyzstan and Alaska.

The length of the fore wings is about 16 mm.

Subspecies
Pseudohermonassa ononensis ononensis  (Bremer, 1861)  (southern Siberian Mountains)
''Pseudohermonassa ononensis scaramangae  (Alpheraky, 1882)  (Kyrghyzstan)

External links
mothphotographersgroup
Colour Atlas of the Siberian Lepidoptera
Noctuinae (Noctuidae) collection of Siberian Zoological Museum

Noctuinae